Vĩnh Thịnh may refer to:

Places in Vietnam
Vĩnh Thịnh, Bạc Liêu, a commune in  Hòa Binh District, Bac Lieu Province
Vĩnh Thịnh, a commune of Vĩnh Lộc District, Thanh Hóa Province
Vĩnh Thịnh, a commune of Vĩnh Tường District, Vĩnh Phúc Province

Other uses
an era name of Emperor Lê Dụ Tông